Crescent Arena, also known as the Saskatoon Arena and Crescent Rink, was an indoor arena in Saskatoon, Saskatchewan.  It was built in the 1910s and was the home of the Saskatoon Sheiks of the WCHL and Saskatoon Wesleys of the SJHL.  The arena was destroyed in 1932 so the Broadway Bridge could be built.  It was eventually replaced by a newer Saskatoon Arena in 1937.

References

Defunct indoor ice hockey venues in Canada
Sports venues in Saskatchewan
Defunct indoor arenas in Canada